Louis McCullough (born in Goose Creek, South Carolina) is an American professional basketball player.

McCullough currently plays for Paraguayan Olimpia, after a successful spell at Chester Jets in the British Basketball League. Previously the Forward has played for Mexican teams Astros de Tecate and Osos de Guadalajara in the Liga Nacional de Baloncesto Profesional, and was picked up as the number one draft pick for the South Carolina Heat in the World Basketball Association in 2005.

McCullough, who is the half brother of former basketball player Kevin Garnett, and cousin to Shammond Williams, was inline for the 2004 NBA Draft, before dropping out early while still studying at Francis Marion University.

References

Living people
American expatriate basketball people in Mexico
American expatriate basketball people in the United Kingdom
Basketball players from South Carolina
Cheshire Jets players
Francis Marion Patriots men's basketball players
People from Berkeley County, South Carolina
American men's basketball players
Year of birth missing (living people)